Banquet is the fourth album by German progressive rock band Lucifer's Friend, released in 1974. By this time there was no hard rock sound, it was now strictly progressive rock mixed with jazz fusion. The song "Our World Is a Rock 'n' Roll Band" was the opening track on some versions (i.e. the U.S. version) of the original LP release, but the only CD releases to date do not include this track, which can instead be found as a bonus track on the Repertoire Records CD release of their self-titled debut.

Track listing

U.S. Vinyl Release

Personnel

Band
 John Lawton – lead vocals 
 Peter Hesslein – electric and acoustic guitars, 12-string guitar, percussion, backing vocals
 Dieter Horns – bass, backing vocals
 Herbert Bornhold – drums, percussion, backing vocals
 Peter Hecht – piano, organ, Moog synthesizer, electric piano (Fender Rhodes)

Additional musicians
 Herb Geller – alto saxophone (track 1), flute (track 4)
 Karl-Hermann Lüer – baritone saxophone
 Stefan Dobrzynski – tenor saxophone
 Wilfried Schoberanzky – bassoon
 Klaus Holle – flute
 Franz Behle – oboe
 Rolf Lind – French horn
 Hans Alves – English horn
 Kurt Donocik, Luigi Schaufub, Walter Hillinghaus – cello
 Günter Fulisch, Heinz Reese, Waldemar Erbe, Wolfgang Ahlers – trombone
 Bob Lanese, Heinz Habermann, Manfred Moch – trumpet
 Bruno Korzuschek, Günter Grünig, Werner Knupke – viola
 Fritz Köhnsen, Günter Klein, Günther Zander, Heinz Donocik, Helmut Jochens, Helmut Rahn, Ingeborg Kaufmann, Otto Kaufmann, Reinhold Gabriel, Senia Daschewski – violin
 Dave Brian, Elvira Herbert, Sheila McKinley – choir

Production
 Lucifer's Friend – producer, arranger
 Peter Hecht – horns & strings arrangement
 Sebastian F.B. Dietrich – photography
 Volker Heintzen – engineer

External links

References

1974 albums
Lucifer's Friend albums
Repertoire Records albums
Vertigo Records albums